Aaron Samuel Olanare (born 4 June 1994) is a Nigerian professional footballer who plays as a striker for Turkish club Erzurumspor.

Club career
Olanare started his senior career in the Nigerian team Shooting Stars. In 2012, Olanare signed for Norwegian team Vålerenga. He had been followed closely by the club after being on trial at the club, in the summer of 2012. On 10 July 2013, Olanare signed with another Norwegian team Sarpsborg 08.

On 9 July 2014, Olanare transferred to Chinese Super League side Guangzhou R&F on a two-and-a-half-year contract with the fee of €1.4 million. On 19 July 2014, he made his Super League debut in a 3–2 home win against Jiangsu Sainty and provided an assist in the match. He scored his first goal in China on 31 July 2014, which ensured Guangzhou R&F beat Liaoning Whowin 5–1.

On 17 February 2016, CSKA Moscow announced the signing of Olanare on loan from Guangzhou R&F for the remainder of 2015–16 season. On 2 May 2016, early on in the 2015–16 Russian Cup final game against Zenit St. Petersburg he injured his knee in a collision with Axel Witsel. He stayed on the field and scored an equalizer that made the score 1–1, after which he performed two flips,  which exacerbated his knee condition. After another collision with Domenico Criscito, he had to be carried over from the field on a stretcher. CSKA lost the game to Zenit with the score of 1–4. He had to undergo surgery in early June and his recovery was expected to take until the end of 2016 as his CSKA loan contract expired.

On 28 January 2017, Olanare signed a –year contract with CSKA Moscow.

On 22 February 2018, he joined FC Amkar Perm on loan until the end of the 2017–18 season. In his third league game for Amkar on 31 March 2018, he scored twice to give his team an unexpected victory with a score of 2–1 over the league-leading FC Lokomotiv Moscow.

On 14 August 2018, CSKA Moscow announced that Olanare had left the club after his contract was cancelled by mutual consent. 

On 12 October 2018, he signed a one-year contract with Beitar Jerusalem as a free player.

On 1 March 2019, Olanare joined League One newcomers Sichuan Longfor. He went on to have a prolific scoring season for the club, earning 19 goals in 27 league matches, ending the season as the club's top goalscorer.

In February 2020 after Sichuan folded due to financial difficulties, Olanare joined China League One club Changchun Yatai on a three-year contract.

International career
In October 2014, Olanare received his first call up for Nigeria national football team by Stephen Keshi to play against Sudan in the 2015 Africa Cup of Nations qualification. On 11 October 2014, he made his debut for the Super Eagles in a 1–0 away defeat against Sudan, coming on as a substitute for Nosa Igiebor in the 47th minute. On 15 October 2014, Olanare scored his first goal in a 3–1 home victory against Sudan. He restored Nigerias lead in the 66th minute when he stabbed home a loose ball after a mix-up between Sudan goalkeeper Akram El Hadi and his defender. Olanare scored his second goal for Nigeria in a 2–0 away victory over Congo. He scored the second goal of the match to secure the victory.

Career statistics

Club
.

International goals

Scores and results list Nigeria's goal tally first.

Honours

Club
Changchun Yatai
 China League One: 2020

References

External links
 
 

1994 births
Sportspeople from Port Harcourt
Living people
Association football forwards
Nigerian footballers
Nigeria youth international footballers
Nigeria under-20 international footballers
Nigeria international footballers
Dolphin F.C. (Nigeria) players
Vålerenga Fotball players
Sarpsborg 08 FF players
Guangzhou City F.C. players
PFC CSKA Moscow players
FC Amkar Perm players
Beitar Jerusalem F.C. players
Sichuan Longfor F.C. players
Changchun Yatai F.C. players
Büyükşehir Belediye Erzurumspor footballers
Eliteserien players
Chinese Super League players
Russian Premier League players
Israeli Premier League players
China League One players
TFF First League players
Nigerian expatriate footballers
Expatriate footballers in Norway
Nigerian expatriate sportspeople in Norway
Expatriate footballers in China
Nigerian expatriate sportspeople in China
Expatriate footballers in Russia
Nigerian expatriate sportspeople in Russia
Expatriate footballers in Israel
Nigerian expatriate sportspeople in Israel
Expatriate footballers in Turkey
Nigerian expatriate sportspeople in Turkey